ISO 3166-2:LV is the entry for Latvia in ISO 3166-2, part of the ISO 3166 standard published by the International Organization for Standardization (ISO), which defines codes for the names of the principal subdivisions (e.g., provinces or states) of all countries coded in ISO 3166-1.

Currently for Latvia, ISO 3166-2 codes are defined for 36 municipalities and 7 state cities. The seven state cities have special status equal to the municipalities.

Each code consists of two parts, separated by a hyphen. The second part is either of the following:
 three digits: municipalities
 three letters: state cities

Current codes
Subdivision names are listed as in the ISO 3166-2 standard published by the ISO 3166 Maintenance Agency (ISO 3166/MA).

Subdivision names are sorted in Latvian alphabetical order: a, ā, b-c, č, d-e, ē, f-g, ģ, h-i, ī, j-k, ķ, l, ļ, m-n, ņ, o-s, š, t-u, ū, v-z, ž.

Click on the button in the header to sort each column.

Changes
The following changes to the entry have been announced by the ISO 3166/MA since the first publication of ISO 3166-2 in 1998:

Codes before Newsletter II-3

See also
 Subdivisions of Latvia
 FIPS region codes of Latvia
 NUTS codes of Latvia

External links
 ISO Online Browsing Platform: LV
 Municipalities of Latvia, Statoids.com

2:LV
ISO 3166-2
ISO 3166-2
Latvia geography-related lists